Le Parfum de la dame en noir is a novel by Gaston Leroux featuring the character of Joseph Rouletabille. It was adapted for the screen four times:
 Le Parfum de la dame en noir (1914 film)
 Le Parfum de la dame en noir (1931 film)
 Le Parfum de la dame en noir (1949 film)
 Le Parfum de la dame en noir (2005 film)